Vattaram is a 2006 Indian Tamil-language action gangster film written, produced, and directed by Saran. The film stars Arya, Napoleon, and Kirat Bhattal. The film's score and soundtrack are composed by Bharadwaj.  The film released on 21 October 2006. This film declared an average grosser at the box office. The film was dubbed in Hindi as Are You Ready To Fight.

Plot

Burma (Arya) is the son of Gurupadam's (Napoleon) chauffeur (Nassar). Gurupadam, a rich businessman and arms dealer is Burma’s role model, and his dream is to be like him. Soon, his father is framed by Ayravadham (Dhandapani), Gurupadam's right-hand man, and unable to bear the humiliation, he commits suicide. Burma grows up in the mean streets to be a gun dealer and waits for an opportunity to enter Gurupadam’s house and take revenge. Soon, he wins over Gurupadam and his daughter Sangeetha (Kirat Bhattal). But Ayra and Veeravel (Ramji), Gurupadom’s elder son, are tooth and nail opposed to him and fear that he will take over their empire. However, Burma uses tact and cunningness to overcome their resentment and wins over Gurupadom’s trust. Slowly, he starts to understand the machinations of the power play in the underworld. He uses Gurupadam’s bitter foe Karuppusamy aka A. K. Samy (Avinash), who was once Gurupadam's close friend to his advantage and causes havoc, which leads to a gripping climax.

Cast

 Arya as Burma
 Napoleon as Gurupadam, a rich businessman and arms dealer
 Kirat Bhattal as Sangeetha Gurupadam
 Ramji as Veeravel Gurupadam, Gurupadam's elder son
 Raaghav as Vetrivel Gurupadam, Gurupadam's younger son
 Dhandapani as Ayravadam (Ayra)
 Avinash as Karuppusamy aka A. K. Samy 
 Adithya Menon as Corrupt Inspector
 Vasundhara as Veena
 Nassar as Burma's father
 Anoop Kumar as Ramesh
 Srinath as Veena's Brother
 Ramesh Khanna as Dilli, Burma's Sidekick
 Vaiyapuri as Burma's Sidekick
 Nellai Siva 
 Balu Anand

Production
The film was initially titled Veerasagasam, with Vijay entitled to play the lead role. Saran had initially cast Vasundhara Kashyap in the lead role and rechristened her with the stage name of Adhisaya, before his team convinced him to cast someone else.

Music
The soundtrack was composed by Bharadwaj with lyrics by Vairamuthu.

Reception
Sify wrote "Saran's Vattaram is an engaging action packed masaala entertainer which moves at rapid pace. Director Saran has spiffily shot and stylishly packaged the film with a milieu that is new to Kollywood - Gun running trade". The film's performance at the box office was impacted by the sudden release of delayed films including Varalaru and Vallavan.

References

External links 
 
 

2006 films
2000s Tamil-language films
Films directed by Saran
Films scored by Bharadwaj (composer)